Robertson County is the name of three counties in the United States:

 Robertson County, Kentucky
 Robertson County, Tennessee
 Robertson County, Texas